Men Cry Bullets is a 1999 American comedy-drama film written and directed by Tamara Hernandez and starring Jeri Ryan.

Cast
Steven Nelson as Billy
Honey Lauren as Gloria
Jeri Ryan as Lydia
Michael Mangiamele as Paper Boy
Harry Ralston as Freddy Fishnets
Bob Sherer as Booster

Release
The film had its world premiere at the South by Southwest film festival in September 1999.  The film was then screened at the Angelika Film Center in New York City on October 22, 1999.  It was also screened at the Roxie Theater in San Francisco on November 12, 1999.

Reception
The film has a 40% rating on Rotten Tomatoes.  Joe Bob Briggs of United Press International awarded the film one star.

Accolade
The film won the Best Narrative Feature award at the South by Southwest film festival.

References

External links
 
 

American comedy-drama films
1999 comedy-drama films
1999 films
1990s English-language films
1990s American films